Land ownership in the United Kingdom is distributed in a Pareto-like distribution, with a relatively small number of organisations and estates, and to a lesser extent people, owning large amounts, whether by area or value, and much larger numbers owning small amounts or no land at all.

Large land owners by area
Land ownership by area does not correspond to land ownership by value.  The value of land varies widely, depending on location but also condition, contaminated land might constitute a liability.  The value of land being eroded by the sea or other natural processes declines rapidly.  Land in the centre of large cities may be very valuable, for example £7.2 million per hectare was cited for central London in 2016, compared with around £2500 per hectare for grouse moors in Scotland.

Other large central government landowners include the Environment Agency and National Highways, apart from extensive local government holdings. Merton College, Oxford University owns , and other colleges and universities have varying land holdings, from campus, playing fields and accommodation to significant endowments in town and country.

Charities, trusts and the Church of England are also significant land owners.  The National Trust and the National Trust for Scotland own , the RSPB  , the Duke of Atholl's Trusts , the Church of England  and the Honourable Artillery Company .

Common land
An amount of land is common land, which refers to rights to the land which are in common.  This land may be owned but the rights are still held in common, for example a right to roam.

References

Land management in the United Kingdom